The small town of Kakanui lies on the coast of Otago, in New Zealand, fourteen kilometres to the south of Oamaru. The Kakanui River and its estuary divide the township in two. The part of the settlement south of the river, also known as Kakanui South, formerly "Campbells Bay", was developed as a collection of cribs (holiday homes). A recent increase in the development of subdivisions has increased the density of dwellings within South Kakanui.

The Kakanui River reaches the sea near the town, and the low range known as the Kakanui Mountains stretches inland from south of Oamaru towards the Maniototo. Kai Tahu used to temporarily occupy Kakanui as they travelled north and south, as evidenced by the midden on the north side of the estuary.

The area around Kakanui has a reputation for its limestone formations, and produces many fossils. Quarrying formerly took place. The rich and fertile soil of the area around the river has physical properties which make it perfect for use in sports grounds, especially cricket pitches. Many of New Zealand's top cricket venues use Kakanui soil on their wicket blocks.

Beaches
Kakanui's main beach, south of the main headland, is known as Campbell's Bay. It provides the first surfable break and the first safe swimming beach (apart from Timaru's Caroline Bay) south of Banks Peninsula. The beach has a length of approximately two kilometres, and the southern end, known as All Day Bay, offers more shelter than the northern end, but with less surf. The sandy beach below the shingle spit north of the river mouth stretching toward Oamaru is safely swimmable. The beaches south of the main headland feature orange sand. The northern beach has white sand.

Horticulture

Kakanui's rich volcanic soil suits intensive horticulture. The township contains a number of glasshouses, primarily used for growing tomatoes, but also producing cucumbers and capsicums (bell peppers). Land surrounding the settlement (especially to the north towards the settlement of Totara) also features market gardens (often operated by Chinese New Zealanders) growing a wide range of vegetables. Kakanui has a particular reputation for its new-season potatoes, which sell throughout all New Zealand.

History

Kakanui (originally Kakaunui) was once a bustling port on the northern side of the river, with a hotel, blacksmith, meat works, and a post office. Kakanui's commerce declined after the construction of the railway inland (going through Maheno) and with the advent of the frozen-meat trade from 1882.

Demographics
It is part of the larger Maheno statistical area.

Kakanui had a population of 402 at the 2018 New Zealand census, an increase of 63 people (18.6%) since the 2013 census, and an increase of 27 people (7.2%) since the 2006 census. There were 177 households. There were 198 males and 204 females, giving a sex ratio of 0.97 males per female, with 72 people (17.9%) aged under 15 years, 33 (8.2%) aged 15 to 29, 186 (46.3%) aged 30 to 64, and 102 (25.4%) aged 65 or older.

Ethnicities were 92.5% European/Pākehā, 9.0% Māori, 2.2% Pacific peoples, 1.5% Asian, and 3.0% other ethnicities (totals add to more than 100% since people could identify with multiple ethnicities).

Although some people objected to giving their religion, 59.0% had no religion, 29.9% were Christian, 0.7% were Buddhist and 3.0% had other religions.

Of those at least 15 years old, 72 (21.8%) people had a bachelor or higher degree, and 66 (20.0%) people had no formal qualifications. The employment status of those at least 15 was that 141 (42.7%) people were employed full-time, 54 (16.4%) were part-time, and 6 (1.8%) were unemployed.

Naming error

Kakanui has been shown on LINZ maps as "Taranui" since 1978. However, this name is not in use locally, nor is it evident on road signs. "Taranui" may be a naming error from early maps referring to a station farm of that name, located slightly inland from Kakanui.

References 

Populated places in Otago
Waitaki District